Paul Bausch (May 27, 1895 – September 1, 1981) was a German politician of the Christian Democratic Union (CDU) and former member of the German Bundestag.

Life 
In 1924 Bausch was co-founder of the Protestant-Conservative Christian People's Service, which was merged into the Christian Social People's Service in 1929. In 1945 Bausch was one of the co-founders of the CDU in Württemberg-Baden and became a member of the CDU state executive there. He was one of the advocates of an interdenominational party foundation, which wanted to abolish the political division between Protestants and Catholics.  From 1946 to 1950 Bausch was a member of the state parliament in Württemberg-Baden. From 1947 to 1949 he was a member of the state council of the American zone. He had been a member of the German Bundestag since the first Bundestag elections in 1949 to 1965, representing the constituency of Böblingen in parliament. From 1953 to 1957 he was chairman of the Bundestag committee for press, radio and film issues. In 1951, together with Willi Steinhörster (SPD), Bausch secured institutional support for the "Bund für Vogelschutz" (now NABU) from the federal budget.

Literature

References

1895 births
1981 deaths
People from Korntal-Münchingen
People from the Kingdom of Württemberg
Recipients of the Order of Merit of Baden-Württemberg
Christian Social People's Service politicians
Members of the Bundestag for the Christian Democratic Union of Germany
Members of the Bundestag for Baden-Württemberg
Members of the Bundestag 1949–1953
Members of the Bundestag 1953–1957
Members of the Bundestag 1957–1961
Members of the Bundestag 1961–1965